Being You Is Great, I Wish I Could Be You More Often is a solo studio album by American rapper and producer Quelle Chris. It was released via Mello Music Group on February 10, 2017. The seventeen-track record featured guest appearances by the likes of Roc Marciano, Homeboy Sandman, Denmark Vessey, Jean Grae, Elzhi, Cavalier, and Wasted Youth among others.

Critical reception

Paul Simpson of AllMusic gave the album 3.5 stars out of 5, describing it as "an uneasy but truth-filled album of reflections and observations which should be easily relatable to moody, reserved types."

Track listing

References

External links
 

2017 albums
Hip hop albums by American artists
Mello Music Group albums
Albums produced by Quelle Chris
Albums produced by the Alchemist (musician)